Anthony Zettel (born August 9, 1992) is a former American football defensive end. He played college football at Penn State. He was drafted by the Detroit Lions in the sixth round of the 2016 NFL Draft.

High school career
Zettel attended Ogemaw Heights High School in West Branch, Michigan, where he was a first-team all-state selection as a senior. He recorded 82 solo tackles, 25 assisted tackles and dropped the quarterback in the backfield seven times as a senior.

Zettel also lettered in baseball, basketball and track & field at Ogemaw Heights. He also participated in sprints, running the 100-meter dash in 11.55 seconds and helping Ogemaw's 400m sprint relay post a season-low 45.95 in 2010.

Zettel was rated as a four-star recruit and was listed as the nation's No. 6 prep defensive end by Rivals.com.

College career
Zettel played inside and outside during a 2014 first-team All-Big Ten season at Penn State and recorded 17 tackles for loss, eight sacks, and three interceptions. He was moved inside in 2015 and his production dipped a bit with 47 tackles, 11 for loss, four sacks and six pass breakups.

Professional career

Detroit Lions
Zettel was drafted in the sixth round (202nd overall) by the Detroit Lions in the 2016 NFL draft. He recorded his first career sack against New York Giants quarterback Eli Manning in Week 15 of the 2016 NFL season.

On September 5, 2018, Zettel was waived by the Lions.

Cleveland Browns
On September 6, 2018, Zettel was claimed off waivers by the Cleveland Browns. He was released during final roster cuts on August 31, 2019.

Cincinnati Bengals
On October 17, 2019, Zettel was signed by the Cincinnati Bengals. He was waived on October 21, but re-signed on October 23. He was waived on December 17, 2019.

San Francisco 49ers
On December 23, 2019, the San Francisco 49ers signed Zettel. Zettel reached Super Bowl LIV with the 49ers, but the team was defeated by the Kansas City Chiefs.

Minnesota Vikings
On March 25, 2020, Zettel signed with the Minnesota Vikings. He was released on September 2, 2020.

New Orleans Saints
On September 19, 2020, Zettel was signed to the New Orleans Saints practice squad. He was elevated to the active roster on December 5 for the team's week 13 game against the Atlanta Falcons, and reverted to the practice squad after the game. He was released on January 11, 2021, but re-signed with the practice squad on January 13. Zettel was released again on January 16.

San Francisco 49ers (second stint)
On July 27, 2021, Zettel signed with the San Francisco 49ers.

Retirement
On August 6, 2021, Zettel announced his retirement from professional football.

References

External links
Penn State Nittany Lions bio

1992 births
Living people
Players of American football from Michigan
People from West Branch, Michigan
American football defensive tackles
Penn State Nittany Lions football players
Detroit Lions players
Cleveland Browns players
Cincinnati Bengals players
San Francisco 49ers players
Minnesota Vikings players
New Orleans Saints players